Rangsit University Volleyball Club is a professional volleyball team based in Pathum Thani, Thailand. The club was founded in 2016 and plays in the Thailand league.

Honours

Domestic competitions 

 Women's Volleyball Pro Challenge
  Champion (1): 2016
  Runner-up (3): 2017, 2018, 2019

Former names 

 Rangsit University VC (2016–present)

League results

Team roster 2019–20 
As of February 2020

 Head coach :  Suwat Jeerapan

Head coach

Imports

Notable players 

Domestic Players

 Pattiya Juangjan
 Jutarat Montripila
 Irada Poldon

Foreign players

Yeung Sau Mei

External links
 Official facebook

References

Volleyball clubs in Thailand
Men's volleyball in Thailand
Women's volleyball in Thailand